The White Building or White Block may refer to:

in Cambodia
 White Building (Phnom Penh), a major work of New Khmer Architecture
 White Building (film)

in the United Kingdom
White Building, London, England, an arts centre

in the United States
 White Building (Bloomington, Illinois), listed on the National Register of Historic Places (NRHP)
W.E. White Building, Stockton, Illinois, NRHP-listed
Josephine White Block, Providence, Rhode Island, NRHP-listed
F. F. White Block, Monroe, Wisconsin, NRHP-listed in Green County

See also
White House (disambiguation), which includes a number of buildings named "White House"